Poplar station can refer to

Poplar DLR station, a station on the Docklands Light Railway in London
Poplar station (PAAC), a station on the Pittsburgh light rail network
Poplar railway station, a former station on the London and Blackwall Railway
Poplar (East India Road) railway station, a former station on the North London Railway

See also
Poplar (disambiguation)